Aleksei Aleksandrovich Goryushkin (born 19 September 1988) is a Russian professional football player. He plays for FC Forte Taganrog.

Club career
He made his Russian Football National League debut for FC Tekstilshchik Ivanovo on 7 July 2019 in a game against FC Yenisey Krasnoyarsk.

External links
 

1988 births
People from Kostroma
Sportspeople from Kostroma Oblast
Living people
Russian footballers
Association football defenders
FC Spartak Kostroma players
FC Tekstilshchik Ivanovo players